Because, Because of a Woman is a 1963 French comedy film directed by Michel Deville.

Cast
 Jacques Charrier as Remy Fertet
 Mylène Demongeot as Lisette
 Juliette Mayniel as Chloé
 Marie Laforêt as Agathe
 Jill Haworth as Cécilia
 Odile Versois as Nathalie
 Helmut Griem as Johann Muller
  as Haudoin (as Grégoire)
 Louis Velle as Bertier

References

External links
 

1963 films
1963 comedy films
1960s French-language films
French comedy films
French black-and-white films
Films directed by Michel Deville
1960s French films